In the Shadow of the Stars is a 1991 American documentary film about the San Francisco Opera by the husband-and-wife team of Irving Saraf and Allie Light as it depicts the lives of the various members of the chorus, rather than the big name stars.

Operas featured in the film
The Flying Dutchman (Richard Wagner)
The Rake's Progress (Igor Stravinsky)
Macbeth (Giuseppe Verdi)
L'Africaine (Giacomo Meyerbeer)
Il Trovatore (Verdi)
La Boheme (Giacomo Puccini)

Accolades
The film which won the 1991 Academy Award for Best Documentary Feature for Light and Saraf.

Availability
It was released on DVD in 2005 with extra scenes and the Oscar acceptance speech by Saraf as bonus features.

It is available for streaming.

References

External links
In the Shadow of the Stars at Light-Saraf Films

Trailer

1991 films
American documentary films
Best Documentary Feature Academy Award winners
Documentary films about classical music and musicians
Culture of San Francisco
Films about opera
1991 documentary films
1990s English-language films
1990s American films